Joshua Campbell (born August 10, 1978) is a former American soccer player.

Club career
After graduating from Clemson University, where he had been named ACC Men's Soccer Tournament MVP in 1998, Campbell was signed to A-League side Charleston Battery ahead of the 2000 season. He would go on to make five appearances for Charleston Battery.

During the 2000–01 National Professional Soccer League season, Campbell joined the Baltimore Blast, where he would make seven appearances.

Career statistics

Club

Notes

References

1978 births
Living people
Clemson University alumni
American soccer players
Association football goalkeepers
Clemson Tigers men's soccer players
A-League (1995–2004) players
National Professional Soccer League (1984–2001) players
Charleston Battery players
Baltimore Blast players